Persoonia juniperina, commonly known as prickly geebung,  is a species of flowering plant in the family Proteaceae and is endemic to south-eastern Australia. It is a small erect to low-lying shrub with smooth bark, hairy new branches, linear leaves, yellow flowers borne singly or in groups of up to forty in leaf axils, and yellowish green to purplish fruit.

Description

Taxonomy
Persoonia juniperina was first formally described in 1805 by French naturalist Jacques Labillardière in his book Novae Hollandiae Plantarum Specimen from specimens collected in Tasmania.

Four varieties of P. juniperina are accepted by the Australian Plant Census as at October 2020:
 Persoonia juniperina var. brevifolia Meisn.; 
 Persoonia juniperina Labill. var. juniperina;  
 Persoonia juniperina var. mollis Orchard; 
 Persoonia juniperina var. ulicina Meisn. 

Within the genus Persoonia, P. juniperina is classified in the lanceolata group, a group of 54 closely related species with similar flowers but very different foliage. These species will often interbreed with each other where two members of the group occur.

Distribution and habitat
Persoonia juniperina is found across Tasmania and from Green Cape on the New South Wales far south coast, south through Victoria and into southeastern South Australia as far west as Adelaide.

Ecology
A field study manipulating pollination showed P. juniperina was partly self-compatible but cross-pollination led to greater fruit production.

References

juniperina
Flora of New South Wales
Flora of Victoria (Australia)
Flora of Tasmania
Flora of South Australia
Plants described in 1805
Taxa named by Jacques Labillardière